is a Japanese actor and voice actor affiliated with Aoni Production. His major roles include Treize Khushrenada in Mobile Suit Gundam Wing, Hisashi Mitsui in Slam Dunk, Meisuke Nueno in Hell Teacher Nūbē, Kunimitsu Tezuka in The Prince of Tennis, Byakuya Kuchiki in Bleach, Zero in Mega Man X, Yuu Matsuura in Marmalade Boy, Shigure Sohma in Fruits Basket, Dark in D.N. Angel and Toriko in Toriko, and he is soon going to be Voice Acting Kokushibou in Demon Slayer. As a singer, he was one of the members for Entertainment Music Unit from 1995 to 2000. He is married to voice actress Ai Maeda. His range is A～E♯ and his dialect is Osakan. His older sister is an animator.

Biography
Okiayu was born in Kitakyushu, Fukuoka Prefecture in 1969, moved to Osaka Prefecture when he was in the third grade of elementary school due to his parents' work, and lived in Nankō Port Town in Suminoe-ku, Osaka. His father had worked at a movie company for a time before Okiayu was born, and he would sometimes get anime posters and cels from his old colleagues. Because of this environment, Okiayu and his sister, who is one year older than him, loved anime and often listened to theatrical anime records and dramas together. His sister was skilled in the field of drawing, having been involved in animation for some time, but Okiayu found more enjoyment in imitating the voices of characters than in drawing, and he came to feel that speaking dialogue was an interesting thing to do. In his first year of high school after entering Abeno High School, he began to think about becoming a voice actor, and began to request information about training schools, but due to financial reasons, he decided to wait until after graduation and began working part-time during his high school years to save money. However, he spent the money on other things, so he ended up borrowing from his parents to attend the training school. His parents advised him to go to college, but he decided to go to the training school because he had no goals in mind. While there were almost no training schools in Osaka at the time, he auditioned and entered the Aoni Juku Osaka School. He passed an audition for Aoni Production through an in-house screening and moved to Tokyo from Osaka. He is said to have cried when he got the acceptance letter. When he first moved to Tokyo, he went to his cousin's place to find a room.

Okiayu claims that his first jobs as a voice actor were a radio commercial for a prep school and the voice of a remote-controlled robot roaming around the Expo '90 site. His first work in anime was as a Bodkin archer in Dragon Quest and his first regular role was as Franz Heinel in Future GPX Cyber Formula. His first starring role was in the OVA Dark Cat. The role of Meisuke Nueno in Hell Teacher Nūbē was his first leading role in a TV anime. He said that Nūbē was the culmination of his career and that he was able to put himself fully into the role and play it naturally because he was close to Meisuke's age, and he said he cried when he heard it was over.

Okiayu has taken over some of the roles from late Kaneto Shiozawa, Kazuyuki Sogabe, Tsuyoshi Takishita, and Unshō Ishizuka. Since 2016, he has also been working as a stage actor in the theater company Hero Hero Q Company. In 2023, Okiayu was a recipient of the Best Supporting Actor Award at the 17th Seiyu Awards.

Filmography

Anime

Film

Tokusatsu

Other live-action

Audio dramas

Video games

Dubbing

Other roles

References

External links
  
 Ryōtarō Okiayu at GamePlaza-Haruka- Voice Acting DataBase 
 Ryōtarō Okiayu at Hitoshi Doi's Seiyuu Database
  
 
 Ryōtarō Okiayu profile at Oricon 
 
 

1969 births
20th-century Japanese male actors
21st-century Japanese male actors
Aoni Production voice actors
Japanese male stage actors
Japanese male video game actors
Japanese male voice actors
Living people
Male voice actors from Fukuoka Prefecture
Seiyu Award winners
Voice actors from Kitakyushu